Anthony Silfredo Castro (born April 13, 1995) is a Venezuelan professional baseball pitcher in the Washington Nationals organization. He has played in Major League Baseball (MLB) for the Detroit Tigers, Toronto Blue Jays, and Cleveland Guardians.

Career

Detroit Tigers
Castro signed with the Detroit Tigers as an international free agent in July 2011 and would spend all of 2012 and 2013 with the VSL Tigers. In 2014, he played for the GCL Tigers and would go on to post a 6–3 record and 4.10 ERA over thirteen games, with twelve starts. He would, however, miss all of 2015 as a result of Tommy John surgery and against spent 2016 with the GCL Tigers, finally making his full-season Tigers organization debut in 2017 with the West Michigan Whitecaps. That season he posted a 10–6 record with a 2.49 ERA as a starter, only allowing opponents to hit .226 off of him. 

He impressed in 2018 with the Lakeland Flying Tigers with a 9–4 record, 2.93 ERA, and a career-high 101 strikeouts. He earned a brief two-week call-up that season to the AA Erie SeaWolves where he started three games and returned to Lakeland having posted an 8.10 ERA, but only allowing a .229 average off of him. In 2019, Castro would spend the season with Erie and start pitching out of the bullpen. After four appearances, however, he would return to a role as a starter. He gained notoriety within the Tigers' organization as he held opponent to a career-low .207 average against and would earn a spot in the top-twenty Tigers prospects for the mid-season update of the MLB.com organizational listing. Castro was re-signed after becoming a minor league free agent on November 7, 2019.

Castro was added to the Tigers 40–man roster following the 2019 season. Castro made his major league debut on July 27, 2020, but gave up a two-run homer in one inning of work.

Toronto Blue Jays
On December 7, 2020, Castro was claimed off waivers by the Toronto Blue Jays. On January 21, 2021, Castro was designated for assignment by the Blue Jays following the signing of Tyler Chatwood. Castro was outrighted on January 27. On April 14, 2021, Castro was selected to the active roster.

Cleveland Guardians
On April 7, 2022, the Blue Jays traded Castro to the Cleveland Guardians in exchange for Bradley Zimmer. Castro was designated for assignment on September 1, 2022.

Baltimore Orioles
On September 3, 2022, Castro was claimed off waivers by the Baltimore Orioles.

Washington Nationals
On December 14, 2022, Castro signed a minor league deal with the Washington Nationals.

References

External links

1995 births
Living people
Buffalo Bisons (minor league) players
Cleveland Guardians players
Detroit Tigers players
Erie SeaWolves players
Gulf Coast Tigers players
Lakeland Flying Tigers players
Leones del Caracas players
Major League Baseball pitchers
Major League Baseball players from Venezuela
Venezuelan expatriate baseball players in the United States
Mesa Solar Sox players
Toronto Blue Jays players
Venezuelan Summer League Tigers players
West Michigan Whitecaps players